Many aircraft types have served in the British Royal Air Force since its formation in April 1918 from the merger of the Royal Flying Corps and Royal Naval Air Service. This is a list of RAF aircraft, including all currently active and retired types listed in alphabetic order by their RAF type name. For just those aircraft currently in service, see List of active United Kingdom military aircraft. Aircraft operated with the Fleet Air Arm from 1924 until 1939 were operated by the Royal Air Force on behalf of the Navy and are included;  those operated by the Royal Navy after it re-acquired control of the aircraft used to support its operations in 1939 are not, but all aircraft operated in conjunction with the Navy are listed at List of aircraft of the Fleet Air Arm. Army Air Corps aircraft are not included but can be found at List of aircraft of the Army Air Corps.

For aircraft operated before the merger of the RFC and RNAS in 1918:
 Refer to List of aircraft of the Royal Flying Corps
 Refer to List of aircraft of the Royal Naval Air Service.

Regular service with the RAF

Aircraft impressed into RAF service

Civil aircraft

Military aircraft

Captured or interned 
Captured or interned examples of the following aircraft were at one time flown by either the RAF or more normally by the Royal Aircraft Establishment for evaluation.

Argentine aircraft
 FMA IA 58 Pucará, Eleven Argentinian aircraft were captured during the Falklands War. Six were taken back to the United Kingdom. Two are on display at the RAF Museum Cosford and at the North East Aircraft Museum.

German aircraft
 Arado Ar 96, Ar 196, Ar 232, Ar 234
 Blohm & Voss BV 138, BV 155, BV 222
 Brunswick LF-1 Zaunkonig
 Bücker Bü 131, Bü 180, Bü 181 
 Dornier Do 17, Do 24, Do 217, Do 335
 DFS 228
 Fieseler Fi 103, Fi 156, Fl 282 
 Focke-Achgelis Fa 223, Fa 330
 Focke-Wulf Fw 58, Fw 189, Fw 190, Ta 152, Fw 200
 Fokker D.VII
 Gotha Go 145, Go 150
 Halberstadt D.III
 Heinkel He 59, He 111, He 115, He 162, He 177, He 219
 Henschel Hs 129, Hs 130
 Horten Ho IV, Ho 229
 Junkers Ju 52/3m, Ju 87, Ju 88, Ju 188, Ju 290, Ju 352, Ju 388, W 34
 Klemm Kl 35
 Messerschmitt Bf 108, Bf 109, Bf 110, Me 163, Me 262, Me 323, Me 410
 Siebel Fh 104, Si 204

Italian aircraft
 Caproni Ca.100, Ca.101, Ca.148, Ca 309, Ca.311
 Caproni-Campini CC.2
 Cant Z.501, Z.506
 Fiat CR.42, G.12, G.50, G.55
 Macchi MC.200, MC.202
 Saiman 200, 202
 Savoia-Marchetti SM.73, SM.79, SM.81, SM.82, SM.95

Japanese aircraft
 Kawasaki Ki-48, Ki-61, Ki-100
 Kawanishi H6K
 Kyushu K9W
 Mitsubishi A6M, G4M, J2M, Ki-21, Ki-46, Ki-67
 Nakajima A6M2-N, L2D, Ki-43, Ki-44
 Yokosuka MXY8
 Tachikawa Ki-36, Ki-54, Ki-55

Schneider Trophy seaplanes 
Aircraft used by the Royal Air Force in support of its efforts in the Schneider Trophy races, and includes aircraft used solely as trainers.
 Fairey Flycatcher biplane floatplane
 Fairey Firefly IIM biplane floatplane
 Fairey Fleetwing biplane floatplane
 Gloster I 1925 & 1927 biplane floatplane
 Gloster III 1925 biplane floatplane
 Gloster IV 1926-1927 biplane floatplane
 Gloster VI Golden Arrow 1929 monoplane floatplane
 Short Crusader 1927 monoplane floatplane
 Supermarine S.5 1927 monoplane floatplane
 Supermarine S.6 1929 monoplane floatplane
 Supermarine S.6B 1931 monoplane floatplane

Training gliders
The following Gliders are or were flown by RAF training squadrons:
 Slingsby Cadet TX.1 - Single-seat training glider
 Slingsby Cadet TX.2 - Single-seat training glider
 Slingsby Sedbergh TX.1 - Two-seat training glider
 Slingsby Prefect TX.1 - Single-seat training glider
 Slingsby Cadet TX.3 - Two-seat training glider
 Slingsby Grasshopper TX.1 - Primary Glider
 Slingsby T.45 Swallow - Single-seat Glider
 Slingsby T.53B
 Slingsby Venture T.2 - Two-seat self launching motor glider
 Elliotts Eton TX.1 - Primary glider
 Grob Viking TX.1 - German built training glider
 Grob Vigilant T.1 - German built self Launching motor glider (1991)
 Schempp-Hirth Janus C - German built training sailplane
 Schleicher Valiant TX.1 - German built sailplane
 Schleicher Vanguard TX.1 - German built training glider

Airships and balloons
 List of British airships
 Barrage balloons

UAVs and drones
 Airspeed Queen Wasp - target drone
 de Havilland Queen Bee - target drone
 Fairey Queen - target drone
 GAF Jindivik - Target drone
 General Atomics Reaper - ISTAR
 Meggitt Banshee
 Miles Queen Martinet
 Target Technology Ltd Imp

See also
List of aircraft of the Royal Naval Air Service
List of aircraft of the Fleet Air Arm
List of aircraft of the Army Air Corps (United Kingdom)

Notes

Footnotes

References

 Halley, James J. The Squadrons of the Royal Air Force & Commonwealth 1918-1988. Tonbridge, Kent, UK: Air-Britain (Historians) Ltd., 1988. .
 Hamlin, John F. The Oxford, Consul & Envoy File. Tonbridge, Kent, UK: Air-Britain (Historians) Ltd., 2001. 
 Jefford, C.G. RAF Squadrons, a Comprehensive record of the Movement and Equipment of all RAF Squadrons and their Antecedents since 1912. Shrewsbury, Shropshire, UK: Airlife Publishing, 1988 (second edition 2001). .
 Moss, Peter W, Impressments Log Volume 1 United Kingdom.  Tonbridge, Kent, UK: Air-Britain (Historians) Ltd., 1962.
 Moss, Peter W, Impressments Log Volume 3 United Kingdom.  Tonbridge, Kent, UK: Air-Britain (Historians) Ltd., 1964.
 Moyes, Philip J.R. Bomber Squadrons of the RAF and their Aircraft. London: Macdonald and Jane's (Publishers) Ltd., 2nd edition 1976. .
 Owen Thetford: Aircraft of the Royal Air Force since 1918 7th edition. Putnam & Co., London 1978, .
 Rawlings, John D.R. Coastal, Support and Special Squadrons of the RAF and their Aircraft. London: Jane's Publishing Company Ltd., 1982. .
 Rawlings, John D.R. Fighter Squadrons of the RAF and their Aircraft. London: Macdonald & Jane's (Publishers) Ltd., 1969 (2nd edition 1976, reprinted 1978). .

External links

 RAF Museum collection by type
 List of aircraft types and details

Royal Air Force aircraft
United Kingdom
Royal Air Force lists
Royal Air Force